Pickle Gap is a pass in Faulkner County, Arkansas, in the United States.

History
According to one account, the gap received its name when a container of pickles broke there while in transit.

References

Landforms of Faulkner County, Arkansas